Jeong Seung-won (born 27 February 1997) is a South Korean football midfielder. He currently plays for the Suwon Samsung Bluewings.

Club career
Born on 27 February 1997, Jeong made his debut as a substitute for Daegu FC on 6 May 2017, playing against Jeonbuk FC in the K League 1. He was a nominee for youth player of the year in the 2018 K League Awards.

Club career statistics

International career
In December 2019, Jeong was selected to be part of the South Korean squad for the 2020 AFC U-23 Championship, to be held in Thailand. South Korea won the championship, with Jeong playing in four matches.

Honors and awards

Player
Daegu FC
 Korean FA Cup Winners (1) : 2018

International
South Korea U23
AFC U-23 Championship: 2020

References

External links 
 

1997 births
Living people
People from Jeonju
Association football forwards
South Korean footballers
Daegu FC players
K League 1 players
Footballers at the 2020 Summer Olympics
Olympic footballers of South Korea
Sportspeople from North Jeolla Province